Grey Dawn or Gray Dawn may refer to:

"Grey Dawn" (South Park), an episode in the animated television series South Park.
Grey Dawn (album), a 1998 album by the Swedish band October Tide
Grey Dawn (film), a 2015 Ghanaian-Nigerian drama film
Gray Dawn (video game), a 2018 Romanian video game
Grey Dawn II (1962–1991), a French Thoroughbred racehorse
The Gray Dawn (1922 film), a silent movie directed by Benjamin B. Hampton